Michael Conrad Hirt (1613–1671) was a German Baroque artist.

Hirt became a court painter in Berlin, where he made portraits and paintings of historical subjects.  He is also well known for his work for St. Nicolas Church, Stendal. Hirt was born and died in Bayreuth.

References

1613 births
1671 deaths
People from Bayreuth
German Baroque painters